Events in the year 2017 in Trinidad and Tobago.

Incumbents
 President: Anthony Carmona
 Prime Minister: Keith Rowley
 Chief Justice: Ivor Archie

Events
2017 Tobago House of Assembly election

Deaths
2 February – Angelo Bissesarsingh, writer and historian (b. 1982).
25 April – Prince Bartholomew, cricketer (b. 1939)
29 December – Clyde Cumberbatch, cricket umpire (b. 1936).

References

 
2010s in Trinidad and Tobago
Years of the 21st century in Trinidad and Tobago
Trinidad and Tobago
Trinidad and Tobago
Trinidad and Tobago